Quail is a collective name for several genera of mid-sized birds generally placed in the order Galliformes. The collective noun for a group of quail is a flock, covey, or bevy.

Old World quail are placed in the family Phasianidae, and New World quail are placed in the family Odontophoridae. The species of buttonquail are named for their superficial resemblance to quail, and form the family Turnicidae in the order Charadriiformes. The king quail, an Old World quail, often is sold in the pet trade, and within this trade is commonly, though mistakenly, referred to as a "button quail". Many of the common larger species are farm-raised for table food or egg consumption, and are hunted on game farms or in the wild, where they may be released to supplement the wild population, or extend into areas outside their natural range. In 2007, 40 million quail were produced in the U.S.

New World
Genus Callipepla
Scaled quail, (commonly called blue quail) Callipepla squamata
Elegant quail, Callipepla douglasii
California quail, Callipepla californica
Gambel's quail, Callipepla gambelii
Genus Cyrtonyx
Montezuma quail, Cyrtonyx montezumae
Ocellated quail, Cyrtonyx ocellatus
Genus Dactylortyx
Singing quail, Dactylortyx thoracicus
Genus Philortyx
Banded quail, Philortyx fasciatus
Genus Colinus
Northern bobwhite, Colinus virginianus
Black-throated bobwhite, Colinus nigrogularis
Spot-bellied bobwhite, Colinus leucopogon
Crested bobwhite, Colinus cristatus
Genus Odontophorus
Marbled wood quail, Odontophorus gujanensis
Spot-winged wood quail, Odontophorus capueira
Black-eared wood quail, Odontophorus melanotis
Rufous-fronted wood quail, Odontophorus erythrops
Black-fronted wood quail, Odontophorus atrifrons
Chestnut wood quail, Odontophorus hyperythrus
Dark-backed wood quail, Odontophorus melanonotus
Rufous-breasted wood quail, Odontophorus speciosus
Tacarcuna wood quail, Odontophorus dialeucos
Gorgeted wood quail, Odontophorus strophium
Venezuelan wood quail, Odontophorus columbianus
Black-breasted wood quail, Odontophorus leucolaemus
Stripe-faced wood quail, Odontophorus balliviani
Starred wood quail, Odontophorus stellatus
Spotted wood quail, Odontophorus guttatus
Genus Oreortyx
Mountain quail, Oreortyx pictus
Genus Rhynchortyx
Tawny-faced quail, Rhynchortyx cinctus

Old World
Genus Coturnix
Common quail (also called Pharaoh, Bible, European or Nile quail), Coturnix coturnix
Japanese quail, Coturnix japonica
Stubble quail, Coturnix pectoralis
†New Zealand quail, Coturnix novaezelandiae  (extinct)
Rain quail, Coturnix coromandelica
Harlequin quail, Coturnix delegorguei
†Canary Islands quail, Coturnix gomerae (fossil)
Genus Synoicus
Brown quail, Synoicus ypsilophorus
Blue quail, Synoicus adansonii
King quail, Synoicus chinensis
Snow Mountain quail, Synoicus monorthonyx
Genus Perdicula
Jungle bush quail, Perdicula asiatica
Rock bush quail, Perdicula argoondah
Painted bush quail, Perdicula erythrorhyncha
Manipur bush quail, Perdicula manipurensis
Genus Ophrysia
Himalayan quail, Ophrysia superciliosa  (critically endangered/extinct)

Quail in cookery

Quail that have fed on hemlock (e.g., during migration) may induce acute kidney injury due to accumulation of toxic substances from the hemlock in the meat; this problem is referred to as "coturnism".

See also 
 Quail eggs
 Domesticated quail

References

External links

 
 

 
Birds by common name